Andrew Robinson (born January 6, 1988) is a male water polo player from Canada. He was a member of the Canada men's national water polo team, that claimed the bronze medal at the 2007 Pan American Games in Rio de Janeiro, Brazil.

Playing as a holechecker Robinson played in his first international competition at the 2006 Junior Pan American Championship in Montreal. He studied business at the University of Calgary. His sister Christine plays for the national women's water polo team.

References
 Canadian Olympic Committee

1988 births
Canadian male water polo players
Living people
Water polo players from Montreal
University of Calgary alumni
Pan American Games bronze medalists for Canada
Pan American Games medalists in water polo
Water polo players at the 2007 Pan American Games
Medalists at the 2007 Pan American Games